The Journal of the Australian Early Medieval Association is an annual peer-reviewed academic journal published by the Australian Early Medieval Association. It covers research on the early Middle Ages, broadly defined as the period from the late Roman Empire to the Norman Conquest (roughly 400 CE to 1100 CE). It examines art history, archaeology, literature, linguistics, music, and theology, and from any interpretive angle – memory, gender, historiography, medievalism, and consilience. It was established in 2005 and the editor-in-chief is Geoffrey D. Dunn (Australian Catholic University). The journal is abstracted and indexed in Scopus.

References

External links

Publications established in 2003
History journals
Annual journals
English-language journals
Academic journals published by learned and professional societies
Medieval studies literature